James Walbourne is a British singer, guitarist, and multi-instrumentalist. He is the current lead guitarist in The Pretenders as well as one-half of The Rails.

Biography 
When he was young he wanted to play in clubs around America and to fulfill his dream he left school to go on a tour in the US with Peter Bruntnell and there he became a member of the bands Pernice Brothers and Son Volt. He became a member of The Kinks’ front-man Ray Davies’s solo band and of The Pogues. In 2008, he was recruited to The Pretenders by Martin Chambers just before the Breakup the Concrete tour.

In 2005 he formed a band, Royal Gun, with his brother Rob Walbourne but that disbanded after a short tour of England and the US. In 2010, he started working on his first solo album The Hill, and it was released in 2011 by Heavenly Records.

Family and music 
In 2007, when Linda Thompson was working on her album Versatile Heart, the author Nick Hornby, introduced Walbourne to Thompson where he met Kami Thompson for the first time, but their intimacy did not grow and nothing came of it at the time. In 2011, they accidentally met in Los Angeles at the 50th-anniversary show for McCabe's Guitar Shop and this time their relationship grew and the pair eventually married in 2012.

They founded The Rails and released their first album Fair Warning on Island Records.

Discography 

 Peter Bruntnell - Normal For Bridgwater Slow River Records 1999
 Dust - A Dirt Track Odyssey Bar De Lune LUNECD16 2002
 Peter Bruntnell - Ends Of The Earth Back Porch, Virgin 2002
 Death In Vegas - Scorpio Rising Concrete 2002
 Peter Bruntnell - Played Out Loose 2004
 Peter Bruntnell - Ghost In A Spitfire Loose 2005
 Bap Kennedy – The Big Picture 2005
 Pernice Brothers - Discover A Lovelier You Ashmont Records 2005
 Pernice Brothers - Nobody's Watching Ashmont Records 2005
 Saint Etienne - What Have You Done Today Mervyn Day? (Original Soundtrack Recording)
 Foreign Office 2006
 Pernice Brothers - Live A Little Ashmont Records 2006
 Edwyn Collins - Home Again Heavenly 2007
 Linda Thompson - Versatile Heart Rounder Records 2007
 Pretenders - Break Up The Concrete Shangri-La Music 2008
 Pretenders* - The Best Of / Break Up The Concrete Rhino Records 2009
 Joe Pernice - It Feels So Good When I Stop - Novel Soundtrack One Little Indian, Ashmont
 Records 2009
 Jerry Lee Lewis - Mean Old Man Verve Forecast 2747091 2010
 Pernice Brothers - Goodbye, Killer Ashmont Records ASHM012 2010
 Pretenders - Live In London Strobosonic 2010
 Shane MacGowan & Friends - I Put A Spell On You Independent Records Ltd. 2010
 Peter Bruntnell - Black Mountain U.F.O. Manhaton Records Hatman 2027 2011
 Dead Flamingoes - Habit EP AED 2012
 Bap Kennedy - The Sailor's Revenge (2012)
 Linda Thompson - Won't Be Long Now Pettifer Sounds 2013
 Peter Bruntnell - Black Mountain U.F.O. Manhaton Records Hatman 2027 2011
 James Walbourne - The Hill Heavenly HVNLPC84 UK 2011
 James Walbourne - Drugs And Money EP Heavenly – HVN230CD 2011
 Linda Thompson - Won't Be Long Now Pettifer Sounds 2013
 Edwyn Collins - Understated – AED Records, 2013,
 The Rails - Fair Warning Island Records 2014
 The Rails - West Heath EP Island Records 2014
 The Mark Radcliffe Folk Sessions (The Rails) – digital download only 2014
 Thompson - Family Fantasy 2014
 Jerry Lee Lewis - Rock & Roll Time Vanguard 2014
 Edwyn Collins - Studio Live Session Liechtenstein Society of Sound Music, Real World Records 2014
 Dave Gahan & Soulsavers* - Angels & Ghosts Columbia 2015
 Soulsavers* - Kubrick San Quentin Recordings 2015
 Sarah Cracknell - Red Kite Cherry Red 2015
 The Rails - Australia E.P Rails EP002 2015
 Peter Bruntnell - Nos Da Comrade Domestico Records DMR1962 2016
 Juliette Lewis - Future Deep No Label (Juliette Lewis Self-Released) 2016
 The Rails - Other People Sony/Psychonaut Sounds 2017
 The Pretenders - Alone/Alive 2017
 Mother’s Little Helper - Live At The Boogaloo 2017

Solo albums

Albums with The Rails

References

External links 
 
 Launch of The Rails 
 Interview

Living people
1980 births
British folk guitarists
British rock guitarists
British male guitarists
The Pretenders members